Lower Narrows of the Mojave River, is a narrow gap the Mojave River passes through at Mojave Heights in San Bernardino County, California.

References

Landforms of San Bernardino County, California
Mojave River